To Spring is a 1936 animated musical short produced by Harman and Ising for the MGM cartoon studio's Happy Harmonies series. Although the production credit goes to Harman and Ising this short was actually the first cartoon to be directed by the future cartoon giant William Hanna, along with animator Paul Fennell.

Plot

This short begins with the melting of winter snow as little human-like creatures (either elves or gnomes) below the ground mine colorful crystals. The creatures then process the crystals into liquids that cover the main rainbow colors. This work incites the arrival of spring above on the surface. However, a snowy wind appears and causes issues that hinders the process as the creatures start working harder. In the end, the creatures prevail and spring occurs.

Production
The title is a play on words used to represent the season of spring and action the gnomes must take to wake up and get to work. Lee Blair oversaw the short's vibrant Technicolor process. The short also features the directorial debut of William Hanna, who would later create Tom & Jerry. Hanna co-directed the short with Paul Fennell, but Harman and Ising retained the production credit.  The film is in the public domain, because its copyright was not renewed after an initial 28 year term.
In addition to writing the music, Scott Bradley conducted the orchestra himself, as he did for all cartoons that he scored. Voice work in the short included Delos Jewkes as the wind, and radio actor J. Donald Wilson voicing the head elf.

References

External links
 To Spring at the Internet Movie Database

1936 films
1936 animated films
1930s American animated films
1930s animated short films
Films directed by Hugh Harman
Short films directed by William Hanna
Metro-Goldwyn-Mayer animated short films
American animated short films
Films scored by Scott Bradley
Films about gnomes
Happy Harmonies